The Museum of Glass may be:

 Corning Museum of Glass, Corning, New York, US
 Museum of Glass, Tacoma, Washington, US
 The New Bedford Museum of Glass, New Bedford, Massachusetts, US
 Turner Museum of Glass, Sheffield, UK

See also 
 Glass Museum (disambiguation)